Idrettslaget Averøykameratene is a Norwegian association football club from Averøy, Møre og Romsdal.

The men's football team currently plays in the Third Division, the fourth tier of Norwegian football. It had a stint in the Norwegian Second Division before being relegated after the 1999 season. In 2002 they won their Third Division group, and in the two-leg playoff they beat Bergsøy IL 6–1 on aggregate. They were relegated from the 2003 Norwegian Second Division. In 2006 they prevailed again, beating Skarbøvik IF 5–4 on aggregate, but they were relegated from the 2007 Norwegian Second Division.

References

 Official site 

Football clubs in Norway
Sport in Møre og Romsdal
Association football clubs established in 1951
1951 establishments in Norway